This is a list of articles for the official state and territorial party organisations (or equivalents) of the Liberal Party of Australia.
 Liberal Party of Australia (New South Wales Division) (Site)
 Liberal Party of Australia (Victorian Division) (Site)
 Liberal National Party (Queensland) (Site)
 Liberal Party of Australia (Western Australian Division) (Site)
 Liberal Party of Australia (South Australian Division) (Site)
 Liberal Party of Australia (Tasmanian Division) (Site)
 Liberal Party of Australia (Australian Capital Territory Division) (Site)
 Country Liberal Party (Northern Territory) (Site)

References

Liberal Party of Australia